"Uptight (Everything's Alright)" is a song recorded by American singer-songwriter Stevie Wonder for the Tamla (Motown) label. One of his most popular early singles, "Uptight (Everything's Alright)" was the first hit single Wonder co-wrote.

A notable success, "Uptight (Everything's Alright)" peaked at number three on the US Billboard Pop Singles chart in early 1966, at the same time reaching the top of the Billboard R&B Singles chart for five weeks. Billboard ranked it as the 59th biggest American hit of 1966. An accompanying album, Up-Tight (1966), was rushed into production to capitalize on the single's success. It also garnered Wonder his first two career Grammy Award nominations for Best R&B Song and Best R&B Performance.

Background
The single was a watershed in Wonder's career for several reasons. Aside from the US number-one "Fingertips" (1963), only two of Wonder's singles, "Workout, Stevie, Workout" (1963) and "Hey Harmonica Man" (1964) had both peaked inside of the top forty of the US Billboard Hot 100 chart, peaking at #33 and #29 on that chart respectively. And despite receiving a modicum of chart success, the then 15-year-old Wonder was in danger of being let go. In addition, Wonder's voice had begun to change, and Motown CEO Berry Gordy was worried that he would no longer be a commercially viable artist.

As it turned out, however, producer Clarence Paul found it easier to work with Wonder's now-mature tenor voice, and Sylvia Moy and Henry Cosby set about writing a new song for the artist, based upon an instrumental riff Wonder had devised. Nelson George, in Where Did Our Love Go? The Rise and Fall of the Motown Sound, recorded that Wonder had also sought something based on the driving beat of the Rolling Stones' "(I Can't Get No) Satisfaction", after playing several dates with the Stones on tour and being impressed with the British band. As Wonder presented his ideas, finished or not, "he went through everything," remembered Moy.  "I asked, 'Are you sure you don't have anything else?'  He started singing and playing 'Everything is alright, uptight.'  That was as much as he had.  I said, 'That's it.  Let's work with that.'"  The resulting song, "Uptight (Everything's Alright)", features lyrics which depict a poor young man's appreciation for a rich girl's seeing beyond his poverty to his true worth.

On the day of the recording, Moy had completed the lyrics, but didn't have them in Braille for Wonder to read, and so sang the song to him as he was recording it. She sang a line ahead of him, and he simply repeated the lines as he heard them. In 2008, Moy commented that "he never missed a beat" during the recording.

Cash Box described it as a "rhythmic, fast-moving, chorus backed pop-r&b ditty all about a lucky fella who’s got the world on a string."

Personnel
Stevie Wonder – vocals, keyboards
James Jamerson – bass
Benny Benjamin – drums
The Funk Brothers – additional instrumentation
Johnny Allen – horn arrangement 
The Andantes – background vocals

Charts

Weekly charts

Year-end charts

Certifications

Little Ole Man 
A note-for-note re-recording of Wonder's version was used as the backing track for Bill Cosby's 1967 musical comedy single, "Little Ole Man (Uptight, Everything's Alright)" which was a US#4 hit. Bill Cosby is not related to the song's co-writer Henry Cosby.

Covers and in popular culture
A version by Nancy Wilson reached No. 84 later in 1966.
On July 11, 1994, British reggae singer C. J. Lewis released a cover version under the title "Everything Is Alright (Uptight)". His version reached number 10 on the UK Singles Chart, becoming his second and final UK top-10 hit. It also entered the top 20 in Ireland, the Netherlands, and New Zealand.
The song also appears in the 1995 film Mr. Holland's Opus and is featured on the soundtrack.
The song appeared in the 2013 Glee tribute episode "Wonder-ful" as performed by Cassandra July (Kate Hudson).
The song also appears in D-TV set to Donald's Double Trouble and one bit of Woodland Café.
Wonder's version appears in a 2019 TV commercial for Bank of America.

References 

1965 singles
1966 singles
2007 singles
Stevie Wonder songs
Nancy Wilson (jazz singer) songs
The Supremes songs
C. J. Lewis songs
Songs written by Stevie Wonder
Songs written by Sylvia Moy
Songs written by Henry Cosby
Tamla Records singles
Song recordings produced by William "Mickey" Stevenson
Song recordings produced by Henry Cosby
1965 songs